Quiet City is a 1939 play by Irwin Shaw.

The play had been commissioned for the Group Theatre by Harold Clurman and was directed by Elia Kazan. 

The leading roles were played by Sanford Meisner and Norman Lloyd, with Frances Farmer as the female lead. Other cast included Morris Carnovsky, J. Edward Bromberg, Karl Malden, Martin Ritt, Ruth Nelson, Leif Erickson, Curt Conway and Roman Bohnen. The set was by Mordecai Gorelik.

Presented in April 1939, the play was dropped after only three Sunday night performances at the Belasco Theatre in New York City. "Quiet City didn't work," wrote Lloyd. "Shaw gave up on it."

Aaron Copland's incidental music for the play later became a well-known composition for trumpet, cor anglais, and string orchestra with the same title, Quiet City. "I find it moving because I was the trumpeter in the play," wrote Lloyd, who played the role of David. "The part was that of a kid wandering around New York, wanting to be a trumpet player like Bix Beiderbecke."

References

External links
 

American plays